Soparnik (plural: soparnici) is a usually savoury pie with a filling of Swiss chard. Other names are soparnjak, zeljanik or uljenjak. It is the most famous speciality of the Dalmatian region of Poljica, between Split and Omiš. The original season for the dish was the colder time of the year when older, sweeter chard was available.

Basically, it is a very simple dish made from common ingredients from the region: Chard with onions and parsley between two layers of simplest dough. Among the numerous local variations there are also sweet ones, for example with nuts, dried fruits or caramel.

In 2016, the European Commission listed soparnik as a non-material national heritage of Croatia certified with the specific geographical origin.

History 
In the region it is said to be the prototype of the Italian pizza, which the Romans brought to Italy. Intermittently it was widespread as poor man's food and lenten food. Today it is used as a cultural trademark and sold increasingly on markets and in restaurants and found on events and festivals. Since 2005 (2003?) there's a dedicated soparnik festival in the municipality of Dugi Rat. There is also a “" society (""). Soparnik has been declared to be intangible cultural heritage of Croatia by the Croatian ministry of culture in cooperation with the society.

Preparation 

The chard leaves are cleaned with water and dried very well to prevent the thin dough from drenching. For that purpose they can be left spread out over night and some flour may be added. The chard may be stripped of stems and is cut into strips. Then chopped onions, parsley, olive oil and salt are mixed in.

The dough is made from flour, some salt, some olive oil and water as needed. It is divided into two equal parts and put to rest for a while.

The first part is spread to a very thin, circle-shaped layer (2 to 3 millimetres) on a flour-powdered board. This is evenly covered with filling, except for a small margin.
The other half of the dough is spread in the same manner to form the top of the pie. It is wrapped around the rolling pin and unrolled onto the rest of the pie. The overlapping layers of dough are joined by rolling them in to a rim. To ease the tricky transfer onto the baking hearth the pie may be sprinkled with polenta as a release agent before it is flipped over.

Traditionally, soparnik is baked on a well-heated heath, the so-called , covered directly with embers. At the latest when the upper layer gets bulged from the steam of the boiling filling, it is to be pierced a few times. The pie needs to be baking for about 15 to 20 minutes (in an oven at 200 °C) until the filling has boiled and the fireplace poker gives a rustling sound when scuffing the top (or the dough is brown, respectively). Thereafter, it is taken out, swept clean and flipped over again. After cooling it is spread with olive oil and sprinkled with finely chopped garlic. It is usually cut to rhombical pieces for serving.

See also
 List of pies, tarts and flans

References

Further reading 

 
 

Pies
Croatian cuisine
Articles containing video clips